Pavol Bajza (born 4 September 1991) is a Slovak footballer who play for Hradec Králové.

Career
Born in Žilina. Bajza began his career with Považská Bystrica, later Pavol joined Dubnica in 2006, aged just 15. After progressing through the Dubnica youth system, Bajza (18 years, 175 days) made his first team debut for MFK Dubnica on 27 February 2010 against MŠK Žilina.

Parma
On 22 March 2012, Dubnica agreed a fee with Serie A club Parma for Bajza. He had signed a three-year contract with the club, with effect from 1 July 2012. He made his debut for Parma on 19 May 2013 against US Palermo. He replaced Antonio Mirante after 42 minutes.

On 30 July 2014 Bajza left for F.C. Crotone.

Career statistics

References

External links

PrvaLiga profile 

1991 births
Living people
Sportspeople from Žilina
Slovak footballers
Association football goalkeepers
FK Dubnica players
Parma Calcio 1913 players
F.C. Crotone players
NK Zavrč players
Vejle Boldklub players
Slovak Super Liga players
Serie A players
Serie B players
Slovenian PrvaLiga players
Danish 1st Division players
Slovak expatriate footballers
Expatriate footballers in Italy
Expatriate footballers in Slovenia
Slovak expatriate sportspeople in Italy
Slovak expatriate sportspeople in Slovenia
Olympiakos Nicosia players
1. FC Slovácko players
MFK Karviná players
Slovakia youth international footballers
Slovakia under-21 international footballers
FC Hradec Králové players
Expatriate footballers in the Czech Republic
Slovak expatriate sportspeople in the Czech Republic
FK Iskra Borčice players